Alla Aleksandrovna Butova (22 January 1950 – 24 September 2016) was a Russian speed skater. She competed in the 500 m event at the 1972 Winter Olympics and finished eighth.

References

1950 births
2016 deaths
Olympic speed skaters of the Soviet Union
Russian female speed skaters
Speed skaters at the 1972 Winter Olympics
Sportspeople from Ivanovo